(born May 9, 1955) is a Japanese former professional baseball third baseman in Nippon Professional Baseball. He played his entire career for the Hanshin Tigers from 1974 to 1988.

References

1955 births
Living people
Japanese baseball players
Nippon Professional Baseball infielders
Hanshin Tigers players
Baseball people from Niigata Prefecture